Crunomys is a genus of rodent in the family Muridae native to the Philippines and Sulawesi.
It contains the following species:
 Celebes shrew-rat (Crunomys celebensis)
 Northern Luzon shrew-rat (Crunomys fallax)
 Mindanao shrew-rat (Crunomys melanius)
 Katanglad shrew-mouse (Crunomys suncoides)

References

 
Rodent genera
Taxa named by Oldfield Thomas
Taxonomy articles created by Polbot
Crunomys
Rodents of the Philippines